Zeydun may refer to:
 Zeydun, Bushehr
 Zeydun District, in Khuzestan Province

See also
 Zaidan (disambiguation)
 Zeydan (disambiguation)